Season one of So You Think You Can Dance Australia, the Australian version of the American reality dance-off series So You Think You Can Dance, is hosted by Rogue Traders vocalist Natalie Bassingthwaighte, with Jason Coleman, Matt Lee and Bonnie Lythgoe acting as the judges. The series began airing on Sunday 3 February 2008 at 7.30 pm and continued on Sundays and Mondays until the final on 27 April 2008. Jack Chambers was the inaugural winner of So You Think You Can Dance Australia 2008 taking home $200,000.

Overview

From October to November 2007, auditions for contestants were held in Perth, Brisbane, Melbourne, Adelaide and Sydney. After being selected, through either an impressive initial audition or after a choreography workshop, the top 100 contestants spent a week in Sydney for more auditions, ultimately forming a group of 20. A 600-seat arena was constructed in Sydney for the finals.

Several contestants later performed during the 2007 Australian Idol grand final, as well as Ten's New Year's Eve broadcast.

The song played after each female and male elimination differs each week.

Finals

Top 20 Contestants
From over 3000 contestants, 20 dancers (10 males and 10 females) were chosen to compete in the elimination series, which began on 17 February 2008.

Female Contestants

Male Contestants

Results table

Contestants are in reverse chronological order of elimination.

Performance shows
Green background means the couple won the "Cadbury Flake Breathtaking Moment" for their dance.

Week 1 (17 February 2008) 

Judges: Jason Coleman, Bonnie Lythgoe and Matt Lee

Week 2 (24 February 2008) 

Judges: Jason Coleman, Bonnie Lythgoe and Matt Lee

Week 3 (2 March 2008) 

Judges: Jason Coleman, Bonnie Lythgoe, Matt Lee and Mary Murphy.

Week 4 (9 March 2008) 

Judges: Jason Coleman, Bonnie Lythgoe and Matt Lee.

Week 5 (16 March 2008) 
This week's episode featured guest judge Kelley Abbey.

This episode had each pair performing two routines; one by a professional choreographer, the other by their own conception, the latter being called the "Surprise Challenge". This involved the dances choosing out of three songs (the one they chose being in bold) and three costumes, then creating their unique routine.

Week 6 (30 March 2008) 
This week also featured a solo routine performed by each dancer, based on music from a film.

Solos:

Week 7 (6 April 2008)

Week 8 (13 April 2008) 
In the live results shows, since Bonnie Lythgoe wasn't able to attend, Jason Gilkinson took over her spot on that night.

Week 9 (20 April 2008)

Result shows

Week 1 (18 February 2008) 
Group dance: "LoveStoned"—Justin Timberlake (Jazz; Choreographer: Kelley Abbey
Musical Guest: "Untouched"—The Veronicas
Bottom 3's solos:

 Eliminated:
Courtney Walter
Khaly Ngeth
 New partners:
Kate Wormald
Hilton Denis

Week 2 (25 February 2008) 
Group dance: "Wanna Be Startin' Something"—Michael Jackson (Hip-hop; Choreographer: Matt Lee)
Musical guest: "Soul Man"—Guy Sebastian
Bottom 3's solos:

 Eliminated:
Kassy Lee
Hilton Denis
 New partners:
Kate Wormald
Graeme Isaako

Week 3 (3 March 2008) 
Group dance: "Sing, Sing, Sing (With a Swing)"—Louis Prima (Ballroom; Choreographer: Jason Gilkison)
Musical Guest: "Say It Again"—Scribe feat. Tyra Hammond
Bottom 3's solos:

 Eliminated:
Stephanie Golman
Marko Panzic
 New partners:
None

Week 4 (10 March 2008) 
Group dance: "Church"—T-Pain (Hip-hop; Choreographer: Juliette Verne)
Musical Guest: "When I'm Gone"—Simple Plan
Bottom 3's solos:

 Eliminated:
Laura Brougham
Sermsah Bin Saad
 New partners:
Camilla Jakimowicz
Anthony Ikin

Week 5 (17 March 2008) 
Group dance: "Blackbird"—Dionne Farris (Jazz; Choreographer: Kelley Abbey)
Musical Guest: "Saving My Face"—KT Tunstall
Bottom 3's solos:

 Eliminated:
Camilla Jakimowicz
Joel De Carteret
 New partners:
 None. Now that only ten dancers remaining, new partners are randomly assigned each week. They'll also be voted individually.

Week 6 (31 March 2008) 
Group dance: "Hip Hop Is Dead"—Nas feat. will.i.am (Hip-hop; Choreographer: Nacho Pop)
Musical Guest: "You Will Only Break My Heart"—Delta Goodram
Bottom 4's solos:

 Eliminated:
Jemma Armstrong
Anthony Ikin

Week 7 (7 April 2008) 
Group dance: "The Song of the Heart"—Prince (Jazz; Choreographers: Project Moda)
Musical Guest: "Stop and Stare"—OneRepublic
Bottom 4's solos:

 Eliminated:
Rhiannon Villareal
Henry Byalikov

Week 8 (14 April 2008) 
Group dance: "TBC"—TBC (TBC; Choreographers: TBC)
Musical Guest: "TBC"—TBC
Solos:

 Eliminated:
Vanessa Sew Hoy
Graeme Isaako

Week 10 Finale (27 April 2008) 
Group dances: "Don't Stop The Music"—Rihanna (TBC; Choreographers: TBC)
Musical Guest: "TBC"—TBC
Judge's choice: 
4th Place:
Demi Sorono
3rd Place
Kate Wormald
Runner-Up:
Rhys Bobridge
Winner:
Jack Chambers

Episodes 

1 Overall national viewers, numbers in brackets indicate nightly ratings position.

Ratings
3 February 2008 premiere of So You Think You Can Dance Australia attracted a peak audience of 2.15 million viewers. The show was the night's top-rating program, averaging 1.83 million viewers over its timeslot. The following two audition episodes also put up respectable figures, peaking at 2.04 million and 1.94 million viewers respectively. The Sunday night Top 100 show averaged 1.6 million viewers to become the most watched program of the night.

Since debuting, the weekly performance show had averaged around 1.5 million viewers since its debut. The series one finale averaged 1.8 million viewers, peaking at 2.2 million viewers nationwide. Over 50% of Ten's key 18–49 age demographic had tuned into the show.

References

External links
So You Think You Can Dance Australia official website
So You Think You Can Dance Australia official information on the host and judges
So You Think You Can Dance Australia Top 20 Finalist biographies
So You Think You Can Dance, Sydney Dance Company teachers and dancers

2008 Australian television seasons
Season 01